Twyford Wood, formerly known as Twyford Forest, is a commercial wood around  in Lincolnshire owned by the Forestry Commission, England, an agency of the British Government and managed by its subsidiary, Forest Enterprise (England).

History
During the war, much of the land beyond this was developed from 1943 onwards as RAF North Witham. This was used operationally by the United States USAAF. At the end of air hostilities in Europe, the USAAF handed the site back to the Royal Air Force, who used the site as a bomb-collection dump, from which ordnance was then dispatched for disposal.

At the end of hostilities of the Second World War, the woodland and RAF site were taken over by the Forestry Commission in 1945. In the 1950s, they redeveloped all of their woodlands holdings in the River Trent valley with Scots and Corsican pine for use by local industry, leaving the original Quercus robur oaks on the original woodland in place.

The name Twyford comes from the former medieval village of that name, south of Colsterworth,   Note: there is a similarly named surviving village at SK728103

Present
Managed commercially today by Forest Enterprise (England), the  commercial woodland lies one mile to the east of Colsterworth. To the south is Beaumont Wood.

Soil and geology
The soil association is 712g Ragdale. Chalky till; slowly permeable seasonally waterlogged clayey and fine loamy over clayey soil. Boulder clay over upper Lincolnshire limestone.

Nature conservation
The butterfly reserves are managed by the Lincolnshire branch of Butterfly Conservation. It is home to the dingy skipper and the grizzled skipper.

Facilities
There is a small car park, with access from the A151. The wood is used for off-road motor sport.

References

 Ordnance Survey. (several maps)
 Bruce Barrymore Halpenny Action Stations 2. (1991) .
 Soil Survey of England and Wales. Sheet 4. (1983)
 Institute of Geological Sciences. One-Inch Series, Sheet 143.)

External links
 Forestry Commission
 The Tardis and Twyford Wood

News items
 Lincolnshire Police in November 1997

Forests and woodlands of Lincolnshire
South Kesteven District
Motorsport venues in England